Pauline Elizabeth Latham,  (born 4 February 1948) is a British Conservative Party politician, who was elected at the 2010 general election as the Member of Parliament (MP) for Mid Derbyshire.

Early life
Latham was born on 4 February 1948 in Sleaford, Lincolnshire. She grew up in Nottinghamshire, and her early education was at Bramcote Hills Technical Grammar School. Latham moved to Derbyshire in 1970.

Political life 
She was a Conservative member of Derbyshire County Council from 1987 to 1993, and was a Derby City Councillor from 1992 to 1996 and from 1998 to 2010. She held the position of Mayor of Derby during 2007/08. She was also a governor of Ecclesbourne School for 12 years. She was a candidate for Broxtowe at the 2001 general election, and stood as a European candidate in 1999 and 2004 for the East Midlands.

Parliamentary career 
Latham's name was added to the A-List of high priority Conservative candidates created by David Cameron, and she was selected as the candidate for Mid Derbyshire, a new constituency created as a result of changes proposed by the Boundary Commission for England. She was elected to Parliament at the 2010 general election, with 48.3% of the votes and a majority of 11,292.

Latham voted for the United Kingdom to leave the European Union in the 2016 referendum. She is a member of the European Research Group. Latham voted for then Prime Minister Theresa May's Brexit withdrawal agreement on 29 March 2019. She supported Esther McVey in the 2019 Conservative Party leadership election. In February 2017, Latham said that other governments across Europe should be looking after refugee children from Calais in their jurisdictions, not Britain. She said that refugee children were not under threat of murder, that they were in safe countries, and other governments should deal with them.

In Parliament, she has served on the select committee for International Development.

Following an interim report on the connections between colonialism and properties now in the care of the National Trust, including links with historic slavery, Latham was among the signatories of a letter to The Telegraph in November 2020 from the "Common Sense Group" of Conservative Parliamentarians. The letter accused the National Trust of being "coloured by cultural Marxist dogma".

In the fifty-seventh Parliament, she sponsored the Marriage and Civil Partnership (Minimum Age) Bill, which would raise the legal age for marriage from 16 to 18.

In March 2023, Latham announced she would stand down at the next general election.

Personal life 
Latham has lived in Derbyshire since 1970. She is married to the architect Derek Latham.

Her son Ben died aged 44 in 2018 of an aortic dissection. She has since campaigned for greater awareness of the condition.

Honours and awards 
 :
  2019: Third Class of the Order of Merit of the Ukraine

References

External links

 

1948 births
Living people
Conservative Party (UK) MPs for English constituencies
UK MPs 2010–2015
UK MPs 2015–2017
UK MPs 2017–2019
UK MPs 2019–present
Members of the Parliament of the United Kingdom for constituencies in Derbyshire
Councillors in Derbyshire
Mayors of Derby
Women mayors of places in England
Female members of the Parliament of the United Kingdom for English constituencies
Conservative Party (UK) councillors
21st-century British women politicians
Recipients of the Order of Merit (Ukraine), 3rd class
Officers of the Order of the British Empire
21st-century English women
21st-century English people
Women councillors in England